Fuiloro is a suco and village on the northeastern tip of East Timor. The district capital Lospalos lies in the suco of Fuiloro.

There is an old Portuguese fort at Fuiloro village, where there is also an arched entry. At the entrance to the village, there is a traditional Fataluku-style house on the side of the road. The Don Bosco College is situated in Fuiloro.

Abisu (Vila-De-Avis, Fuiloro) Airfield was a heavy bomber airfield in Second World War consisting of two strips.

External links 
 www.pacificwrecks.com

Lautém Municipality